The Evening Telegram Company, d/b/a Morgan Murphy Media, is an American television and radio company based out of Madison, Wisconsin. The company is named for publisher Morgan Murphy, who expanded the business after he took over from his grandfather, who founded the Superior Evening Telegram (now owned by Forum Communications).

History 
The company was originally known as Morgan Murphy Stations until 2007, when its operating name was slightly changed to Morgan Murphy Media. 

On May 10, 2017, the company announced that it would acquire Saga Communications' television clusters in Joplin, Missouri, including KOAM-TV, and Victoria, Texas, including KAVU-TV. Saga will additionally acquire the assets of Fox affiliates in each market owned by Surtsey Media and operated by Saga under local marketing agreements, including KFJX in Joplin, Missouri and KVCT in Victoria, Texas. Those stations' license assets were acquired by SagamoreHill Broadcasting. The sale was completed September 1.

In September 2018, it was announced that the company would invest in Good Karma Brands to back its acquisition of the Milwaukee radio stations WKTI and WTMJ.

On October 13, 2021, the company dropped its channels from Dish Network due to a programming dispute. This dispute is in addition to Dish's dispute with Tegna and is the 2nd time that a satellite TV company was involved with such conflicts (DIRECTV had a conflict with the companies' stations in December 2020).

Television stations
Stations are arranged in alphabetical order by state and city of license.

Note:
 Indicates a station built and signed on by Morgan Murphy Media (then known as the Evening Telegram Company).
 Owned by SagamoreHill Broadcasting. Morgan Murphy Media operates these stations under a shared services agreement (SSA).

Other properties

Idaho

Radio
1080 KVNI - adult contemporary (Coeur d'Alene, run by Queen B Broadcasting of Spokane, WA)

Wisconsin

Radio
Platteville, Wisconsin (serving Dubuque, Iowa)
1590 WPVL-AM - Sports
106.1 KIYX - Classic Hits 
107.1 WPVL-FM - Top 40
Lancaster, Wisconsin
1280 WGLR-AM - Silent (As of April 1, 2015)
97.7 WGLR-FM - Country
Milwaukee (as a silent partner with Good Karma Brands)
540 WAUK - National ESPN Radio sports talk/play-by-play
620 WTMJ - News/talk & sports play-by-play
94.5 WKTI - Local sports and some play-by-play

Print
Madison Magazine

Washington

Radio
Queen B Broadcasting (Spokane):
700 KXLX - Sports
920 KXLY - News/Talk 
92.9 KZZU - Adult Top 40
94.5 KHTQ - Active Rock
96.9 KEZE - Rhythmic Top 40
99.9 KXLY-FM - Country

References

External links
 Official site

Morgan Murphy Media stations
Radio broadcasting companies of the United States
Television broadcasting companies of the United States
Companies based in Madison, Wisconsin